Dwarfism, low-birth-weight type with unresponsiveness to growth hormone is a very rare genetic disorder which is characterized by developmental delays, intellectual disabilities, and other anomalies. Only 2 cases have been described in medical literature.

Signs and symptoms 

People with this condition often show the following symptoms:

Hearing difficulties
Hypoglycemia
Intellectual disabilities
Fetal growth delays
Severely short height

Epidemiology 

This condition has only been described in 2 brothers born to consanguineous parents. 2 of their other relatives were said to have been affected, but weren't examined themselves.

References 

Genetic diseases and disorders
Dwarfism
Rare genetic syndromes
Syndromes affecting stature
Syndromes affecting hearing